Christian George Begg (born 19 May 1986) is an English cricketer.  Begg is a left-handed batsman who bowls left-arm slow-medium.  He was born in Johannesburg, Transvaal Province, South Africa.

While studying for his degree at Durham University, Begg made his first-class debut for Durham UCCE against Surrey in 2006.  He made a further first-class appearance in 2006, against Nottinghamshire.  In his two first-class matches for the university, he failed to impress with the bat, scoring 4 runs at an average of 1.33, with a high score of 2.

References

External links
Christian Begg at ESPNcricinfo
Christian Begg at CricketArchive

1986 births
Living people
Cricketers from Johannesburg
Alumni of Durham University
South African cricketers
Durham MCCU cricketers